Berlin 07 is a live album by the German experimental music group Cluster. It was recorded in 2007 at a Cluster concert in Berlin, their first there since 1969.

Background
Cluster was initially formed in 1969, breaking up in 1981. A reunion followed in 1990 only for the band to break up again in 1997. It was reformed again in 2007 with a concert in the Kosmische Club in Camden, UK. Following this, sister band Harmonia reformed. Dieter Moebius and Michael Rother toured extensively to allow Roedelius to get on with his solo work. The fully reunited Harmonia played in Berlin in November, followed by a Cluster concert. This is that concert, presented by Important Records, the home label of Cluster collaborator Conrad Schnitzler.

Style
Berlin 07 is recorded much in the style of the duo's two previous albums, both of which drew from Roedelius' Sinfonia Contempora sound, that he developed on his two solo albums Sinfonia Contempora No. 1: Von Zeit zu Zeit and Sinfonia Contempora No. 2: La Nordica (Salz Des Nordens). The album's style differs from the Sinfonia Contempora albums as it quite obviously contains elements of Moebius' style as well. It mixes avant-techno with sound clips and mocking synth growls.

Release and packaging
The album was originally released as a limited edition, which quickly sold out. Following this there came the unlimited edition. It is bereft of an interior booklet or any information other than a promotional sticker on the wrapping, which reads:
CLUSTER Berlin 07. Berlin 07 is a monumental performance for Cluster as it marked the first time they had performed live in Berlin since their twelve hour concert in Gallerie Hammer in the Europacentre 1969. The performance was a massive success as a sold out crowd cheered loudly for Cluster's return to the stage. Fortunately, the concert was preserved for posterity and is now proudly presented to you by Important Records.

Track listing
Part 1 - 29:47 (Moebius/Roedelius)
Part 2 - 36:45 (Moebius/|Roedelius)

Cluster (band) albums
2007 live albums
Important Records albums